Lyndell, Pennsylvania is a populated place in Chester County, Pennsylvania along Pennsylvania Route 282 north of Downingtown, Pennsylvania and just south of Marsh Creek State Park.  The location is referenced for its zip code 19354.

Lyndell is known for being the location of the Brandywine Creek Campground (formerly Frank's Folly). Named in honor of Frank P. Sinex. 
 
Lyndell was also home to singer Jim Croce and his wife Ingrid Jacobsen-Croce for 2 years before his death in a plane crash.

References

Unincorporated communities in Chester County, Pennsylvania
Unincorporated communities in Pennsylvania